130 may refer to:
130 (number)
AD 130
130 BC
Kin Sang stop, MTR digital station code

See also